Hogan's House of Music is Ron Block's fourth solo album and his first solo instrumental album. It was released September 25, 2015. Ron Block is best known for being a member of Alison Krauss & Union Station.

Critical reception

Country Standard Times Fred Frawley writes "Ron Block's Hogan's House of Music works on several levels. The release is a lively and admiring tribute to traditional and bluegrass sounds that made him the player that he is today."

Cybergrass.com says in their review "It’s been a good week for banjo and guitar aficionado Ron Block. Hogan’s House of Music, his first solo instrumental LP, debuted in the #2 slot on the bluegrass sales chart, spending 5 weeks on the chart and missing the top spot by just four units."

The Tennessean'''s Juli Thanki says "Ron Block is perhaps best known as the banjo player for bluegrass stars Alison Krauss & Union Station, but the instrumental virtuoso also is an acclaimed solo musician. This week he releases Hogan's House of Music, his first all-instrumental record."

John Lawless of Bluegrass Today writes "Hogan’s House Of Music'' satisfies on every level. Fans of great picking will revel in the crisp playing and the lovely tones, whiles more general music fans will appreciate the beauty of the original tunes and the classic melodies."

Track listing

Musicians
"Smartville"
Ron Block: Banjo, Rhythm & Lead Guitar
Barry Bales: Bass
Tim Crouch: Fiddle
Jerry Douglas: Dobro
Clay Hess: Rhythm Guitar
Adam Steffey: Mandolin

"Hogan's House Of Boogie"
Ron Block: Banjo, Rhythm & Lead Guitar
Sam Bush: Mandolin
Jerry Douglas: Dobro
Byron House: Bass
Dan Tyminski: Rhythm Guitar
Lynn Williams: Snare

"Wolves A-Howling"
Ron Block: Banjo
Barry Bales: Bass
Stuart Duncan: Fiddle
Adam Steffey: Mandolin
Dan Tyminski: Rhythm Guitar

"The Spotted Pony"
Ron Block: Banjo, Rhythm & Lead Guitar
Barry Bales: Bass
Stuart Duncan: Fiddle
Sierra Hull: Octave Mandolin
Alison Krauss: Fiddle
Adam Steffey: Mandolin
Dan Tyminski: Rhythm Guitar
Lynn Williams: Snare

"Clinch Mountain Backstep"
Ron Block: Banjo, Rhythm & Lead Guitar
Barry Bales: Bass
Stuart Duncan: Fiddle
Clay Hess: Rhythm Guitar
Adam Steffey: Mandolin

"Gentle Annie"
Ron Block: Banjo, Guitar
Tim Crouch: Fiddles, Cello, Bowed Bass
Mark Fain: Bass
Sierra Hull: Octave Mandolin

"Mooney Flat Road"
Ron Block: Banjo, Rhythm & Lead Guitar
Barry Bales: Bass
Stuart Duncan: Fiddle
Sierra Hull: Octave Mandolin
Alison Krauss: Fiddle
Adam Steffey: Mandolin
Jeff Taylor: Accordion
Dan Tyminski: Rhythm Guitar
Lynn Williams: Snare

"Mollie Catherine Carter"
Ron Block: Banjo, Rhythm & Lead Guitar
Barry Bales: Bass
Adam Steffey: Mandolin
Dan Tyminski: Rhythm Guitar

"Seneca Square Dance"
Ron Block: Banjo
Sierra Hull: Mandolin

"Calico"
Ron Block: Banjo, Lead Guitars
Tim Crouch: Fiddles, Cello, Djembe, Shaker
Mark Fain: Bass
Sierra Hull: Mandolins, Octave Mandolin
Dan Tyminski: Rhythm Guitar

"You Are My Sunshine"
Ron Block: Banjo, Lead Guitar solo
Sam Bush: Mandolin
Stuart Duncan: Fiddle
Byron House: Bass
Dan Tyminski: Rhythm Guitar
Lynn Williams: Snare

"Lonesome Road Blues"
Ron Block: Banjo
Barry Bales: Bass
Stuart Duncan: Fiddle
Rob Ickes: Dobro
Dan Tyminski: Rhythm Guitar
Lynn Williams: Snare

"'65 Mustang Blues"
Ron Block: Banjo, Rhythm & Lead Guitar
Sam Bush: Mandolin
Jerry Douglas: Dobro
Byron House: Bass
Dan Tyminski: Rhythm Guitar
Lynn Williams: Snare

"Brushy Fork Of John's Creek"
Ron Block: Banjo, Rhythm & Lead Guitar
Barry Bales: Bass
Stuart Duncan: Fiddle
Adam Steffey: Mandolin
Dan Tyminski: Rhythm Guitar

"Carter's Creek Pike"
Ron Block: Banjo
Barry Bales: Bass
Sam Bush: Mandolin
Jerry Douglas: Dobro
Dan Tyminski: Rhythm Guitar
Lynn Williams: Snare

"Home Sweet Home"
Ron Block: Banjo, Lead & Harmony Guitar
Barry Bales: Bass
Jerry Douglas: Dobro
Adam Steffey: Mandolin
Dan Tyminski: Rhythm Guitar
Lynn Williams: Snare

Production
Recorded at Southern Ground, Nashville, Tennessee by Brandon Bell, with assistant engineer Chris Taylor
Additional recording at Moonlight Canyon Studio, Franklin, Tennessee by Ron Block
Mixed at New Wine Sound Studio, Apple Valley, California by Eric Uglum and Ron Block
Mastered at Euphonic Masters by Brad Blackwood
Art Direction by Josh Peterson
Package Design by Kate Albie Armstrong
Photography by Crystal K. Martel
Management and Booking by Josh Peterson at Music City Management - MusicCityManagement.com
Publicity by Ronna Rubin at Rubin Media - RubinMedia.biz
Track information, musician and production credits taken from the album's liner notes.

References

External links
Ron Block Official Site

2015 albums
Bluegrass albums